Imran Khan (born 14 July 1988) is a Pakistani cricketer who made his Twenty20 debut for the Peshawar Panthers during the 2014–15 season of the Haier T20 Cup. He is a left-arm fast bowler, known for "bamboozl[ing] opposing batsmen" through his "repertoire of slower balls". He made his Twenty20 International debut against Zimbabwe on 27 September 2015.

Hailing from Swat District, Khyber Pakhtunkhwa, Imran played district cricket for Swat in the Peshawar division of the country-wide Inter-District Senior Tournament. Having been selected in the Peshawar Panthers' squad for the 2014–15 Haier T20 Cup, he went on to play seven matches in eight days at the tournament, held in September 2014. Imran finished with twelve wickets from six matches at the tournament, the most of any player. His wickets were taken at a bowling average of 12.91 and a strike rate of 10.91 balls per wicket, and he was accordingly named "best bowler" at the end of the tournament. On debut against the Lahore Eagles, Imran took 4/25 from four overs, for which he was named man of the match. Other notable performances included 2/7 from 1.5 overs against the AJK Jaguars, 2/27 against the Faisalabad Wolves, and 2/26 against the Lahore Lions.

Another member of the Panthers tournament-winning team was Mohammad Imran Khan (born 1987), who is also commonly known as Imran Khan, and who later played Test cricket for the Pakistani national side. For this reason, Imran Khan (born 1987) is often recorded as "Mohammad Imran Khan" or "Imran Khan, Sr." on scorecards, while Imran Khan (born 1988), the subject of this article, is often recorded as "Imran Khan (Swat)" or "Imran Khan, Jr.".

He was the leading wicket-taker for Peshawar in the 2018–19 Quaid-e-Azam One Day Cup, with eleven dismissals in seven matches.

References

1988 births
Living people
Pakistani cricketers
Pakistan Twenty20 International cricketers
People from Swat District
Peshawar Panthers cricketers
Peshawar Zalmi cricketers
Lahore Qalandars cricketers